The governor of Apayao, is the chief executive of the provincial government of Apayao.

Provincial Governors (1995-2025)

References

Governors of Apayao
Apayao